The Warwickshire County Council election was held on 6 May 2021 alongside other local elections across England. All 57 seats on Warwickshire County Council were contested returning one councillor for each division by first-past-the-post voting for a four-year term in office. The electoral divisions were the same as those used at the previous election held in 2017.

Council Composition 
Prior to the election, the composition of the council was:

Conservative: 33
Liberal Democrats: 8
Labour: 7
Green: 2
Nuneaton Community Independents: 2
Whitnash Residents Association: 1
Independent Labour: 1
Vacant: 3

Results

|}

Results by district

North Warwickshire

Nuneaton and Bedworth

Rugby

Stratford-on-Avon

Warwick

References 

Warwickshire County Council elections
2021 English local elections
2020s in Warwickshire